David Furnell (born June 1874) was an English footballer who played as a goalkeeper.

Furnell originally played for Old St Luke's either as a full back or half back before being converted to a goalkeeper. In 1894 the club merged with Castle Swifts F.C. to form Old Castle Swifts and Furnell remained there until they folded in 1895. He then spent a season and a half captaining St Luke's from Beckton before they also folded.

It was towards the end of the 1896–97 season that Furnell, who was already a labourer at the shipbuilding company joined Thames Ironworks, making his debut in the final London League game of the season, a 1–1 draw against Barking Woodville.

He became first choice keeper for the club during the 1897–98 season and helped them win the London League and promotion to the Southern League by keeping clean sheets in five of his ten games. By November 1897 his form was good enough to earn him recognition at a county level when he was selected to play for Essex against Middlesex, a game that Middlesex won 5–2. During that season he also played in all three of the club's FA Cup games, two games in the London Senior Cup, as well as at least ten friendlies, the last of which he played at left-half. In all, he played a minimum of 26 games for Thames Ironworks.

He moved on to Hammersmith Athletic in 1898–99.

See also
 1896–97 Thames Ironworks F.C. season
 1897–98 Thames Ironworks F.C. season

Notes
 In earlier Thames Ironworks and West Ham publications this player has been confused with George Fundell, a forward who also played for Old St. Luke's. He is, however, listed as David Furnell in Who's Who of West Ham United by Tony Hogg (2005) as well as in Iron In The Blood by John Powles (2005)

References

1874 births
Year of death missing
Footballers from West Ham
English footballers
Association football goalkeepers
Thames Ironworks F.C. players
Old Castle Swifts F.C. players